South Bedfordshire was a county constituency in Bedfordshire.  It returned one Member of Parliament (MP)  to the House of Commons of the Parliament of the United Kingdom, elected by the first past the post system.

The constituency was created for the 1950 general election, and abolished for the 1983 general election.

Boundaries and boundary changes
1950–1974: The constituency was created by the Representation of the People Act 1948 as a County Constituency, comprising the Municipal Borough of Dunstable, the Urban District of Leighton Buzzard, the Municipal Borough of Luton wards of Leagrave and Limbury, and the Rural District of Luton.

Leighton Buzzard and surrounding rural areas were transferred from Mid Bedfordshire, and the Leagrave and Limbury wards of Luton, together with Dunstable and surrounding rural areas from the abolished Luton Division of Bedfordshire.

1974–1983 (Second Periodic Review of Westminster Constituencies): The Municipal Borough of Dunstable, the Urban District of Leighton-Linslade, and the Rural District of Luton.

Gained the former Urban District of Linslade from the County Constituency of Buckingham in Buckinghamshire.  This had been merged with Leighton Buzzard to form the Urban District of Leighton-Linslade in 1965.  The Luton wards of Leagrave and Limbury were included in the new Borough Constituency of Luton West.

The constituency was abolished for the 1983 general election.  it was largely absorbed into the new County Constituency of South West Bedfordshire, including Dunstable, Leighton Buzzard and Linslade.  Areas to the north and south of Luton were included respectively in the new County Constituency of North and the new Borough Constituency of Luton South.

Members of Parliament

Elections

Elections in the 1950s

Elections in the 1960s

Elections in the 1970s

References

Parliamentary constituencies in Bedfordshire (historic)
Constituencies of the Parliament of the United Kingdom established in 1950
Constituencies of the Parliament of the United Kingdom disestablished in 1983